Northeast High School is a public high school in Pride, unincorporated East Baton Rouge Parish, Louisiana, United States, north of Zachary and in the Baton Rouge metropolitan area, serving students in grades 7–12. It is a part of East Baton Rouge Parish Public Schools.

The school serves a section of the Brownfields census-designated place.

History
Northeast High School was established in 1981 from the consolidation of Pride High School and Chaneyville High School.

At one time it served a section of Central before the city started its own school district.

Athletics
Northeast High athletics competes in the LHSAA.

Notable alumni
Trindon Holliday, LSU running back and return specialist who broke the school record for men's 100 m dash with a time of 10.02
Johnny Huggins, football player
Doug Williams (Chaneyville), former NFL quarterback for the Washington Redskins and MVP of Super Bowl XXII

References

External links
Northeast High School

Public high schools in Louisiana
Schools in East Baton Rouge Parish, Louisiana
Public middle schools in Louisiana
Educational institutions established in 1981